Tinquilco Lake is one of several lakes in Huerquehue National Park in the La Araucanía Region in southern Chile. Located at 700 meters; it is the first lake visitors encounter in the park before continuing on the "Tres Lagos" (Lago Chico, Lago Toro and Laguna Verde) hike.

Its primary outflow is Quinchol River, which is a tributary of the Liucura River, which in turn is a tributary of the Trancura River.

Notes

References
Photo of Lago Tinquilco at TrekEarth

External links

Lakes of Araucanía Region
Glacial lakes of Chile
Lakes of Chile